Hypercompe guyanensis is a moth of the  family Erebidae. It is found in French Guiana.

References

 Natural History Museum Lepidoptera generic names catalog

Hypercompe
Moths described in 2009